Mordellistena pumila is a species of beetle in the genus Mordellistena of the family Mordellidae. It was described by Gyllenhal in 1810 and can be found everywhere in Europe.

References

Beetles described in 1810
pumila
Beetles of Europe